KQXF (107.3 FM) is an American contemporary hit radio formatted broadcast radio station licensed to serve the community of Osceola, Arkansas, and broadcasting to Mississippi County in Arkansas and Lauderdale and Tipton counties in Tennessee. KQXF is owned and operated by Phoenix Broadcasting Group, Inc.

References

External links

Contemporary hit radio stations in the United States
Radio stations established in 1996
QXF
Osceola, Arkansas